An evening at Trasimeno Lake is Ana Popović's second concert video and live album, with the video released on September 1, 2010, and the album released on September 24, 2010. The album and video mark her first use of the label ArtisteXclusive records. The concert was Popović's second time playing at the Trasimeno Lake Blues Festival, an amphitheater stage with a back drop of a mediaval castle, Rocca Medievale. The video showcases her musical talents and also focuses on the rhythm section who accompanied Popović, plus has some scattered side vignettes of her walking around the castle before the show to add color.  The video also includes an interview with Popović where she talks about balancing her career and her family. In addition to her regular backing band of bassist Ronald Jonker, keyboarder Michele Papadia, and drummer Andrew "Blaze" Thomas, Popović added additional percussion by Stéphane Avellaneda, some brass with Cristiano Arcelli on saxophone and Riccardo Giulietti on trumpet, and some backing vocals by Sandra LaVille.

Video track list

Video personnel

Musicians
 Ana Popović – vocals, guitar, slide guitar
 Ronald Jonker – bass, backing vocals
 Michele Papadia – keys, backing vocals
 Andrew "Blaze" Thomas – drums
 Stéphane Avellaneda – percussion
 Cristiano Arcelli – saxophone
 Riccardo Giulietti – trumpet
 Sandra LaVille – backing vocals

Production
 Simone Pucci - director
 Mark van Meurs - producer
 Henk van Engen - editor
 Mark Dearnley - mixing and engineering
 Recorded live in 2009 in Trasimeno Lake, Italy

Album track list

Album personnel

Musicians
 Ana Popović – vocals, guitar, slide guitar
 Ronald Jonker – bass, backing vocals
 Michele Papadia – keys, backing vocals
 Andrew "Blaze" Thomas – drums
 Stéphane Avellaneda – percussion
 Cristiano Arcelli – saxophone
 Riccardo Giulietti – trumpet
 Sandra LaVille – backing vocals

Production
 Mark van Meurs - producer
 Henk van Engen - editor
 Mark Dearnley - mixing and engineering
 Recorded live in 2009 in Trasimeno Lake, Italy

References

2010 live albums
Ana Popović albums
Live video albums